Bell Shakespeare is an Australian theatre company specialising in the works of William Shakespeare, his contemporaries and other classics. It is based in Sydney.

The Bell Shakespeare vision is to create theatre that allows audiences of all walks of life to see themselves reflected and transformed through the prism of great writing. They are Australia's only national theatre company. Each year they perform a Mainstage season consisting of three theatre productions, including an annual National Tour, and a Learning program to support students, teachers and communities nationally. Bell Shakespeare's Artistic Director is Peter Evans and the Executive Director is Gill Perkins.

One of the Company's artistic goals is "to use Shakespeare as Australians", and Bell Shakespeare is well known for using contemporary styles to make Shakespeare accessible for modern audiences.

Company history 
Founded by John Bell in 1990, Bell Shakespeare began as a theatre company dedicated to producing the plays of William Shakespeare in a way that was relevant and exciting to Australian audiences. With the support of an enlightened philanthropist, the late Tony Gilbert AM, and a small number of imaginative corporate and private supporters, Bell Shakespeare was able to mount productions and attract audiences.

Now 30 years later, Bell Shakespeare enjoys the fruits of its labour: a history rich with legends of the stage; the establishment of a creative development arm, which ensures its artistic vibrancy; theatre, education and community programs characterised by unrivalled national reach and impact; and a loyal and passionate audience that has made the Company that began in a circus tent into a national icon.

Bell Shakespeare is listed as a Major Festival in the book Shakespeare Festivals Around the World.

In 2016, the Australian Federal Government announced a $1 million contribution to the Bell Shakespeare capital campaign, which will help the Company secure a permanent home at Sydney's Pier 2/3, Walsh Bay.

Artistic leadership 

In 2012, John Bell announced the promotion of associate artistic director Peter Evans to the position of co-artistic director. In 2015, John Bell retired from the Company, and Peter Evans was made sole Artistic Director.

Learning 
Since its foundation, Bell Shakespeare has had one unchangeable vision – to make Shakespeare accessible for all Australians, regardless of age, geographic location, or socioeconomic challenges.

Bell Shakespeare continues this vision with a range of learning opportunities for students and teachers in every Australian state and territory throughout the year. This includes in-school performances by The Players. Inspired by the troupe of actors who appear in Hamlet, Bell Shakespeare's Players have been performing abridged adaptions of Shakespeare's works in schools since 1991. A number of tailored workshops, masterclasses and residencies are also available to make Shakespeare accessible to students in an immersive and fun way. Each year, the company creates a theatre production specifically for students. Bell Shakespeare also provides professional learning for teachers.

A range of scholarships to support students and teachers are also provided. This includes the John Bell Scholarship, which provides a once-in-a-lifetime opportunity for students living in regional or remote areas who are interested in a career as a performer, and the regional teacher mentorship which is a fully funded year-long mentorship for teachers in regional, rural and remote Australian schools.

Productions

Recent productions

Production history by play
List of Bell Shakespeare productions (not including Learning productions or special events):

Shakespeare

Other

References

External links

Bell Shakespeare collection at the Performing Arts Collection, Arts Centre Melbourne

Theatre companies in Australia
Shakespearean theatre companies
1990 establishments in Australia
Theatre in Sydney